The South Shore Lumberjacks are a Junior A Ice Hockey team from Bridgewater, Nova Scotia.  They play their home games at the 1,300 seat Lunenburg County Lifestyle Centre. The team is a member of the Maritime Hockey League and plays in the Eastlink South Division.

History
The Maritime Junior A Hockey League (MHL) had its origin in the Metro Valley Junior Hockey League, founded in 1967 as a Junior "B" level hockey league consisting of six teams, all of them based in Nova Scotia. In 1977, the Metro Valley League acquired Junior "A" status and in 1983 expanded to New Brunswick with the addition of the Moncton Hawks.

In 1991, two franchises from Prince Edward Island, based in Summerside and Charlottetown, joined the newly dubbed "Maritime Junior A Hockey League". The Summerside Western Capitals won the League's first ever National Title against South Surrey Eagles from British Columbia.

A tenth team, the Miramichi Timberwolves, was added for the 2000–2001 season. At the end of the 2001–02 season, the League approved the transfer of a team to Yarmouth. The Yarmouth Mariners began play in September 2002 and are now the biggest rival of the South Shore Lumberjacks . In early 2003, the league governors approved expansion into Woodstock, New Brunswick, with the Woodstock Slammers beginning play in the 2003–04 season.

The League got its second national Championship when the Halifax Oland Exports won the 2002 Royal Bank Cup on home ice. In the spring of 2004, the Weeks Hockey Organization bought the club, moved it to New Glasgow, and renamed it the Pictou County Weeks Crushers. On that same day, Halifax was granted an expansion franchise, the Halifax Wolverines.

In 2014 the League approved to add an expansion team in St. Stephen named the St. Stephen Aces. The League has hosted the Royal Bank Cup and Centennial Cup seven times, winning twice. MHL teams have also won seven Fred Page Cups as the Junior "A" Eastern Canadian Champions to earn the right to compete for the Royal Bank Cup.

The origin of the Lumberjacks goes back to April 15, 2008, when the owners of the Halifax Wolverines announced their plans to move to Bridgewater. Following a contest to come up with a name for the new team, the franchise was dubbed the "Bridgewater Lumberjacks." However, by 2014 the Lumberjacks were struggling, and in serious jeopardy of being dissolved or relocated. In November 2014, the MHL stepped in and temporarily took over the management of the team until a new owner was found. Larry Creaser, supported by an experienced group of hockey people and enthusiastic volunteers, assumed ownership and complete financial control of the Lumberjacks. The team was renamed the "South Shore Jr. A  Lumberjacks" in an effort to expand the fan base of the team to nearby communities. Seats at the games were once again the "hottest ticket in town". The last home game of the season sold out with an attendance in excess of 1500 fans.

Season-by-season record

Franchise records

These are franchise records held by previous team rosters. Figures are updated after each completed MHL regular season.

See also
List of ice hockey teams in Nova Scotia

References

External links
 South Shore Lumberjacks

Maritime Junior Hockey League teams
Ice hockey teams in Nova Scotia
Bridgewater, Nova Scotia
2004 establishments in Nova Scotia
Ice hockey clubs established in 2004